Mark Mallia is a self-taught outsider artist who works with abstract and portrait paintings on a variety of mixed media and ceramic sculptures. Mallia is Maltese, born in Pieta, Malta in 1965, and has worked in Malta, Monaco, UK and the United States.

He tackles Duchampian concepts in a provocative way, using found objects, adorning them and elevating them to high art. Mallia's signature style imparts an aggressive energy to his art, fed by his maniacal obsessions that metamorphose into mischief, audacity, insouciance, and mystery. Mallia is known for his maverick character which comes useful in creating a diverse spectrum of works, amongst some of his famous works are Caricatural Portraits and his Crow Series.

Major exhibitions include various solos in Malta including the acclaimed Open Closet, Postcards from Beyond, Black Canvas and Zabach exhibitions, together with collective exhibitions such as Forgotten Spaces, at the Royal Windsor Racecourse UK, at Art Basel Miami, and at the Sporting Club in Monaco.

Mallia is also known for raising funds and awareness of ALS in Malta.

Mallia has collaborated with Angelo Dalli during 2018-2019 on exploring the new space between art and artificial intelligence using the Universal Machine Artist system, teaching AI the concepts of creativity of visual expression.

References

External links
The Art Online Gallery website
111 Art Gallery website

Living people
Maltese artists
1965 births